Horseshoe Island is an island  long and  wide occupying most of the entrance to Square Bay, along the west coast of Graham Land, Antarctica. It was discovered and named by the British Graham Land Expedition under John Rymill who mapped the area by land and from the air in 1936–37. Its name is indicative of the crescentic alignment of the  peaks which give a comparable shape to the island.

Station Y
Lying at the north-western end of the island is Station Y , also known as Horseshoe Base, an inactive but relatively unaltered and completely equipped British research station of the late 1950s. It includes ‘Blaiklock’, a nearby refuge hut. The station was occupied from 11 March 1955 to 21 August 1960, when its personnel were transferred to Stonington Island's Station E. In 1969 it was reopened from 7 March to 11 July to complete local survey work. The site has been designated a Historic Site or Monument (HSM 63), following a proposal by the United Kingdom to the Antarctic Treaty Consultative Meeting.

Turkish Antarctic Research Station
Turkey has announced the island as the chosen location to install its first research base in Antarctica. Having a recent research program - the Turkish Polar Research Program - started in 2017, it has opened temporary facilities on the island in 2018, including a weather monitoring station and a camp. The plan is to build a permanent base for around 50 people, initially operating only during the summer, and later throughout all the year.

See also
 List of Antarctic and sub-Antarctic islands
 Crime in Antarctica
 Russet Pikes

References

External links

Islands of Graham Land
Fallières Coast
Historic Sites and Monuments of Antarctica